Edward Harley, 4th Earl of Oxford and Earl Mortimer,   (2 September 1726 – 11 October 1790), styled Lord Harley from 1741 to 1755, was a British peer and Tory politician.

Early life
Harley was the eldest son of Edward Harley, 3rd Earl of Oxford and Earl Mortimer and Martha Morgan, daughter of Welsh politician William Morgan. His two younger brothers were John Harley, Dean of Windsor and then Bishop of Hereford; and the politician Thomas Harley, who was Lord Mayor of London and also sat in Parliament.

He was educated at Westminster School between 1735 and 1744; and then Christ Church, Oxford, graduating with a Doctor of Civil Law in 1748.

Career

Harley was elected as MP for Herefordshire in at the 1747 general election, even though he was only 20 years old. Prior to the election, Lord Foley wrote to Harley's father, "As he is under age I am in great fear lest some trick should be played on him on the day of election ... which if it should happen I think would be of the most evil consequence to your family as well as to the interest of the county."

He returned unopposed and took a seat on the treasury board, serving until in 1755 he succeeded to his father's titles and estates, including the family seat of Brampton Bryan Castle and Hall.  He was High Steward of Hereford from 1755, a Lord of the Bedchamber from 1760, and Lord Lieutenant of Radnorshire from 1766, all until his death.  He was also Harleian Trustee at the British Museum from 1755 until his death.

Personal life
In 1751, he married heiress Susannah Archer, who brought a dowry of £50,000. Susannah was a daughter of William Archer and his second wife Susanna Newton (a daughter of Sir John Newton, 3rd Baronet of Barrs Court, Gloucestershire).

He died at Brampton Bryan Hall at the age of 64. As he had no children, his titles and estates passed to his nephew Edward Harley.

References

1726 births
1790 deaths
People from Herefordshire
Harley, Edward Harley, Lord
Harley, Edward Harley, Lord
Harley, Edward Harley, Lord
Earls in the Peerage of Great Britain
Lord-Lieutenants of Radnorshire
Edward
Fellows of the Royal Society
Alumni of Christ Church, Oxford
People educated at Westminster School, London